The Octoroon is an Australian film directed by George Young based on a popular play by Dion Boucicault which had recently enjoyed a popular run in Australia. It is considered a lost film.

Synopsis
In the deep south of 1850s USA, an octoroon is given her freedom by her white father but is later bought as a slave by the evil Jacob McCloskey.

Production
The film was shot in Sydney with an old paddle steamer, Narrabeen, standing in for a Mississippi river boat.

Significance
The writer Bruce Dennett has commented on the selection of this material to make an Australian film. "The identifiable influence of Southern stories and characters at such an early stage in the history of Australian film is hard to ignore. The Octoroon is especially notable because it deals with questions of race and blood, issues that were important and enduring social and historical preoccupations of the young Australian nation, as they continued to be for the United States."

References

External links

Full text of the play The Octoroon at Internet Archive

Australian black-and-white films
Australian silent films
Lost Australian films
1911 films
Racism in Australia